Henry Alan Leeke (15 November 1879 – 29 May 1915) was a British track and field athlete who competed in the 1908 Summer Olympics.

Biography
Leeke was the only son of Henry Leeke, also an athlete, and grandson of William Leeke, a Waterloo veteran.
He was born in Weston, Staffordshire.

As his father did before him, Leeke represented Cambridge University in the hammer and shot put, and was English Amateur Champion for both events. He was associated with the London Athletic Club. One of the first British athletes to throw the discus, he set a British record in 1908. During the 1908 Olympic Trials, Leeke threw the javelin 135-8 (41.37m) in the freestyle event.

In 1898 he married Catherine Herbert, younger daughter of Charles G. Fullerton.  They had one son and one daughter, and resided in Hill, Warwickshire.

Shortly after the outbreak of World War I, Leeke joined the Royal Warwickshire Regiment, he was granted a commission as a temporary lieutenant on 22 September 1914, and placed in charge of machine guns for D Company, 9th Battalion.  He died of fever at the Thornhill Isolation Hospital, Aldershot on 29 May 1915 aged 35. He is buried in Aldershot Military Cemetery.

1908 Olympics
In 1908 Leeke participated in the shot put event, in the discus throw competition, in the Greek discus throw event, in the freestyle javelin throw competition, in the javelin throw event, and in the hammer throw competition but in all these competitions his final ranking is unknown.

See also
 List of Olympians killed in World War I

References

External links
profile

1879 births
1915 deaths
British male javelin throwers
British male discus throwers
British male hammer throwers
British male shot putters
Olympic athletes of Great Britain
Athletes (track and field) at the 1908 Summer Olympics
Royal Warwickshire Fusiliers officers
British Army personnel of World War I
British military personnel killed in World War I
Burials at Aldershot Military Cemetery